Sir K. P. Puttanna Chetty Town Hall, locally commonly referred to as Bangalore Town Hall, is a neoclassical municipal building in Bangalore, India, named after the philanthropist and former president of Bangalore City Municipality, Sir K.P Puttanna Chetty.

History 
The building was commissioned and inaugurated by Yuvaraja Kanteerava Narasimharaja Wadiyar and designed by Sir Mirza Ismail. Foundation stone for the building was laid by Maharaja Krishnaraja Wadiyar IV on 6 March 1933. The building was completed on 11 September 1935.

The structure features a flight of steps leading to the entrance porch resting on Tuscan columns with identical columns extending on either sides.

Due to improper acoustics, a renovation was proposed estimated at Rs 1,000,000 in 1976. Postponements delayed renovations till March 1990, when the building was finally closed for renovation. The cost then was Rs 6.5 million (approximately US$371,400).

The auditorium has two floors with a previous total capacity of 1,038 seats. The seating capacity has been reduced to 810 following the renovations.

References

 Town Hall, Bangalore
 The Story of Town Hall

City and town halls in India
Buildings and structures in Bangalore
Government buildings completed in 1935
1935 establishments in British India
British colonial architecture in India
Neoclassical architecture in India
20th-century architecture in India